Leszek Jachna (born May 9, 1958) is a former Polish ice hockey player. He played for the Poland men's national ice hockey team at the 1980 Winter Olympics in Lake Placid, the 1984 Winter Olympics in Sarajevo, and the 1988 Winter Olympics in Calgary.

References

1958 births
Living people
Ice hockey players at the 1980 Winter Olympics
Ice hockey players at the 1984 Winter Olympics
Ice hockey players at the 1988 Winter Olympics
Olympic ice hockey players of Poland
People from Nowy Targ
Sportspeople from Lesser Poland Voivodeship
Polish ice hockey forwards
Podhale Nowy Targ players